Herminie is a census-designated place (CDP) in Sewickley Township, Westmoreland County, Pennsylvania, United States. The population was 856 at the 2000 census.

History
Herminie (pronounced hurr-many) is named for Herminie Berwind, whose husband, Charles Berwind, was President of the Ocean Coal Company. The first mine at Herminie, known as the "Ocean No. 1 Mine," was opened in 1893 by Berwind-White Coal Company, of which Ocean Coal Company was a subsidiary. Fifty double houses were built for miners, plus five single-family houses for managers on Church Street. By 1900, the mine employed 271 people.

Herminie was the scene of two major strikes. During the Westmoreland County Coal Strike of 1910–1911, miners were evicted from company-owned houses, which were used to house strikebreakers, predominantly southern Blacks. The strike was unsuccessful from the strikers' perspective. Another strike, this in 1922, resulted in recognition of the United Mine Workers union.

Ocean No. 1 Mine closed in 1938 due to water problems, although other mines in the nearby area continued operating.

Featured in the documentary, Liquid Assets, about the lack of sewage infrastructure in the town.

Geography

Demographics
At the 2000 census there were 856 people, 368 households, and 231 families living in the CDP. The population density was 3,507.7 people per square mile (1,377.1/km2). There were 402 housing units at an average density of 1,647.3/sq mi (646.7/km2).  The racial makeup of the CDP was 97.9 percent White, 0.2 percent African American, 0.6 percent Native American, 0.5 percent Asian, 0.6 percent from other races, and 0.2 percent from two or more races. Hispanic or Latino of any race were 1.5 percent of the population.
Of the 368 households 28.5% had children under the age of 18 living with them, 46.2 percent were married couples living together, 12 percent had a female householder with no husband present, and 37 percent were non-families. Of all the households, 33.4 percent were made up of individuals, and 18.8 percent had someone living alone who was sixty-five years of age or older. The average household size was 2.33 and the average family size was 2.97.

The age distribution was 23.8 percent under the age of eighteen, 6.4 percent from age eighteen to twenty-four, 30.1 percent from twenty-five to forty-four, 20.1 percent from forty-five to sixty-four, and 19.5 percent who were sixty-five years of age or older. The median age was thirty-eight years. For every 100 females, there were 92.4 males. For every 100 females age eighteen and over, there were 86.3 males.

The median household income was $24,258; and the median family income  was $29,583. Males had a median income of $31,786 versus $15,781 for females. The per capita income for the CDP was $14,988. About 10.0 percent of families and 17.2 percent of the population were below the poverty line, including 15.3 percent of those under age eighteen, and 22.1 percent of those age sixty-five or older.

Notable people
 Sonny Clark (1931–1963), was an American jazz pianist and composer.
 LTC Anthony B. Herbert,  (1930–2014) was a United States Army officer, who served in both the Korean War and the Vietnam War.
 Ernie Hefferle, (1915–2000) was a football player and coach. He served as head football coach at Boston College interim head coach for the New Orleans Saints.
 Lt Joe Kenda (ret.), (b 1946) former Colorado Springs Police Department homicide detective, and star of the Investigation Discovery television show Homicide Hunter.

References

Census-designated places in Westmoreland County, Pennsylvania
Pittsburgh metropolitan area
Populated places established in 1893
Census-designated places in Pennsylvania
1893 establishments in Pennsylvania